Świętoniowa is a village in the administrative district of Gmina Przeworsk, within Przeworsk County, Subcarpathian Voivodeship, in south-eastern Poland.

The village has an approximate population of 800.

It also used to be the home of Miłosz Lasek.

References

Villages in Przeworsk County